The Sacred Heart Pioneers men's ice hockey team is a National Collegiate Athletic Association (NCAA) Division I college ice hockey program that represents Sacred Heart University. The Pioneers are a member of Atlantic Hockey. They play at the Webster Bank Arena in Bridgeport, Connecticut.  From 1993-2016, the Pioneers home arena was the Milford Ice Pavilion in Milford, Connecticut.

History

Division III
Sacred Heart began sponsoring men's ice hockey as a varsity sport in 1993. The team was placed in the South Division of ECAC North/South/Central and because they were not able to schedule all of their ECAC South opponents twice the Pioneers played half a conference schedule in their inaugural year. With a full conference slate the following year, Sacred Heart greatly improved their record which continued in year three.

For the 1996–97 season Shaun Hannah was brought in as head coach and the Pioneers finished with their first winning record and 2nd in the division, narrowly missing the conference postseason.

In the late 1990s the MAAC was mandated to form an ice hockey conference. Two of the ECAC South programs would have to promote themselves to Division I and soon after they were joined by Sacred Heart. With an eye for their new conference, Hannah began offering scholarships to incoming students, a violation of Division III rules, which caused the Pioneers (along with two other ECAC South teams) to be ruled ineligible for any postseason play. Additionally all of their conference games would not be counted in the standings, through they would still be able to play the matches and count the results towards their overall standings.

MAAC
Despite the influx of scholarship athletes, Sacred Heart finished 7th in the first year of MAAC conference play. The team rebounded in the second year, doubling their win total and finishing with a winning record. Postseason success was a little slower in coming with the Pioneers unable to win a playoff game until year 4 of D-I play. During the 2002–03 season Iona and Fairfield, the two original MAAC programs, both announced that they would end their sponsorship of ice hockey at the end of the season. With only one full-time member still active the MAAC terminated their ice hockey division. The remaining 9 programs banded together and formed Atlantic Hockey which began the following year.

Atlantic Hockey
Sacred Heart played well for the first few years of Atlantic Hockey, reaching the championship game in 2004 and 2010 but after Hannah left in 2009, the team took a tumble down the standings. From 2011 through 2018 the Pioneers never finished higher than 8th in the conference. Bench boss C. J. Marottolo was finally able to push the Pioneers out of the basement in 2019 with a 4th-place finish, ending 1 win shy of .500 on the year.

The school announced in 2020 that it would build a $60 million facility for its men's and women's ice hockey programs.  After a delayed start, construction began on the Martire Family Arena in March of 2021, with a new scheduled completion date of 2023 and a new price tag of $70 million. Martire Family Arena will be the first on-campus ice arena for Sacred Heart.

Season-by-season results

Records vs. current Atlantic Hockey teams 
As of the completion of 2018–19 season

Coaches
As of completion of 2022–23 season

Statistical leaders

Career points leaders

Career goaltending leaders

GP = Games played; Min = Minutes played; W = Wins; L = Losses; T = Ties; GA = Goals against; SO = Shutouts; SV% = Save percentage; GAA = Goals against average

Minimum 30 games

Statistics current through the start of the 2020-21 season.

Current roster
.

Awards and honors

NCAA
AHCA Second Team All-Americans
2009–10: Nick Johnson, F
2019–20: Mike Lee, D; Jason Cotton, F

MAAC

Individual awards

Goaltender of the Year
Eddy Ferhi: 2003

Offensive Rookie of the Year
Martin Paquet: 2000

Coaches of the Year
Shaun Hannah: 2000

All-Conference Teams
First Team All-MAAC

2002–03: Eddy Ferhi, G; Les Hrapchak, D; Martin Paquet, F

Second Team All-MAAC

1999–00: Alexis Jutras-Binet, G; Martin Paquet, F
2000–01: Eddy Ferhi, G
2001–02: Eddy Ferhi, G; Martin Paquet, F

MAAC All-Rookie Team

1999–00: Les Hrapchak, D; Martin Paquet, F

Atlantic Hockey

Individual awards

Player of the Year
Jason Cotton: 2020

Best Defensive Forward
Dave Jarman: 2010

Rookie of the Year
Pierre-Luc O'Brien: 2004
Bear Trapp: 2006
Justin Danforth: 2014
Braeden Tuck: 2020

Individual Sportsmanship Award
Alexandre Parent: 2008
Eric Delong: 2013
Braeden Tuck: 2023

Regular Season Scoring Trophy
 Neil Shea: 2022

Coach of the Year
C. J. Marottolo: 2010

All-Conference Teams
First Team All-Atlantic Hockey

2004–05: Pierre-Luc O'Brien, F
2005–06: Jason Smith, G; Pierre-Luc O'Brien, F
2006–07: Jason Smith, G; Scott Marchesi, D; Pierre-Luc O'Brien, F
2007–08: Alexandre Parent, F
2009–10: Nick Johnson, F
2016–17: Justin Danforth, F
2017–18: Cameron Heath, F; Dylan McLaughlin, F
2018–19: Dylan McLaughlin, F
2019–20: Mike Lee, D; Jason Cotton, F; Austin McIlmurray, F
2020–21: Marc Johnstone, F
2022–23: Neil Shea, F

Second Team All-Atlantic Hockey

2003–04: Konn Hawkes, D; Garrett Larson, F
2004–05: Kalen Wright, F
2005–06: Alexandre Parent, F
2007–08: Scott Marchesi, F; Bear Trapp, F
2015–16: Justin Danforth, F
2016–17: Cameron Heath, D; Ryan Schmelzer, F
2017–18: Lester Lancaster, D
2020–21: Braeden Tuck, F
2021–22: Logan Britt, D; Neil Shea, F

Third Team All-Atlantic Hockey

2009–10: Paul Ferraro, D; Dave Jarman, F
2011–12: Matt Gingera, F
2012–13: Eric Delong, F
2018–19: Austin Magera, F
2019–20: Josh Benson, G
2021–22: Braeden Tuck, F
2022–23: Hunter Sansbury, F

Atlantic Hockey All-Rookie Team

2003–04: Pierre-Luc O'Brien, F
2004–05: Scott Marchesi, D; Alexandre Parent, F
2005–06: Bear Trapp, F
2009–10: Steven Legato, G; Eric Delong, F
2013–14: Mitch Nylen, F; Justin Danforth, F
2017–18: Marc Johnstone, F
2018–19: Josh Benson, G; Austin Magera, F
2019–20: Braeden Tuck, F
2022–23: Marcus Joughin, F

Pioneers in the NHL
As of July 1, 2022.

Source:

See also
Sacred Heart Pioneers women's ice hockey

References

External links

 
Ice hockey teams in Connecticut